Paratdih is a census town in the Giridih CD block in the Giridih Sadar subdivision of the Giridih district in the Indian state of Jharkhand.

Geography

Location

Area overview
Giridih district is a part of the Chota Nagpur plateau, with rocky soil and extensive forests. Most of the rivers in the district flow from the west to east, except in the northern portion where the rivers flow north and north west. The district has coal and mica mines. It is an overwhelmingly rural district with small pockets of urbanisation.

Note: The map alongside presents some of the notable locations in the district. All places marked in the map are linked in the larger full screen map.

Demographics
According to the 2011 Census of India, Paratdih had a total population of 8,854, of which 4,521 (51%) were males and 4,333 (49%) were females. Population in the age range 0–6 years was 1,900. The total number of literate persons in Paratdih was 4,112 (59.13% of the population over 6 years).

Giridih Urban Agglomeration is composed of Giridih (Nagar Parishad), Paratdih (CT), Sirsia (CT), Pertodih (CT) and Dandidih (CT).

Infrastructure
According to the District Census Handbook 2011, Giridih, Paratdih covered an area of 1.25 km2. Among the civic amenities, it had 10 km roads with open drains, the protected water supply involved tap water from treated and untreated sources, overhead tank. It had 1,098 domestic electric connections, 3 road light points. Among the educational facilities it had 1 primary school, 1 middle school, the nearest secondary and senior secondary schools at Giridih 5 km away. One important commodity it produced was coal.

References

Cities and towns in Giridih district